The canton of Massy is an administrative division of the Essonne department, Île-de-France region, northern France. It was created at the French canton reorganisation which came into effect in March 2015. Its seat is in Massy.

It consists of the following communes:
Chilly-Mazarin
Massy

References

Cantons of Essonne